Operation Maritime Guard was a NATO blockade, in the international waters of the  Adriatic Sea, of the former Yugoslavia.

Scope

The operation began on November 22, 1992.  It followed NATO Operation Maritime Monitor, and was in support of UN Security Council Resolution 787, which called upon states acting individually or otherwise to enforce the UN embargoes of the former Yugoslavia ("calls upon States ... to use such measures commensurate with the specific circumstances as may be necessary" to enforce the embargo).

It authorized NATO to use force, and included stopping, inspecting, and diverting ships bound for the former Yugoslavia.  All ships bound to or coming from the territorial
waters of the former Yugoslavia were halted for inspection and verification of their cargoes and destinations.

With support from Turkey, the Netherlands, and Germany, the operation was strengthened to allow for NATO aircraft to shoot down aircraft that violated the blockade.  An article in the academic journal International Affairs stated that Operation Maritime Guard was: "the first authorized use of force to back a UN Security Council resolution".

In April 1993, a NATO official said that warships would shoot if necessary to stop a ship to enforce the blockade, with inert munitions which could include machine gun bullets and armor-piercing cannon shells.

Forces and results

The blockade comprised destroyers from Turkey, Italy, Germany, Greece, and the United Kingdom, and frigates from the United States and the Netherlands, assisted by NATO Maritime Patrol Aircraft. The frigate  and aircraft carrier  were among the warships that took part in the operation.  AWACS supported the effort with its sophisticated maritime radar by providing blockading ships with long-range sea surveillance coverage.

The blockade was directed by the Commander-in-Chief Allied Forces Southern Europe, U.S. Admiral Mike Boorda.

Under the blockade, 12,367 ships were contacted, 1,032 of them were inspected or diverted to a port to be inspected, and 9 ships were found to be violating the UN embargoes.

Successor
Its successor was Operation Sharp Guard.  That was a multi-year joint naval blockade in the Adriatic Sea by NATO and the Western European Union on shipments to the former Yugoslavia that began on June 15, 1993, was suspended on June 19, 1996, and was terminated on October 2, 1996.

See also

Yugoslav Wars
Legal assessments of the Gaza flotilla raid

References

External links

 Complete list and text of all resolutions
 UN Security Council Official Website including full text of all resolutions
 Evolution of the Conflict NATO Handbook 

NATO intervention in the former Yugoslavia
United Nations operations in the former Yugoslavia
Blockades
Battles and conflicts without fatalities
1992 in Yugoslavia
1993 in Yugoslavia
Maritime Guard
Military history of the Mediterranean
1992 in military history
1993 in military history